Les Prophéties (The Prophecies) is a collection of prophecies by French physician Nostradamus, the first edition of which appeared in 1555 by the publishing house Macé Bonhomme. His most famous work is a collection of poems, quatrains, united in ten sets of verses ("Centuries") of 100 quatrains each.

The first edition included three whole Centuries and 53 quatrains. The book begins with a preface, in the form of a message to his son César, followed by the Centuries themselves. The second edition was published in the same year and has minor differences from the first.

The third edition was published in 1557, and included the full text of the previous edition, supplemented by three more Centuries. The fourth edition was published two years after the death of the author, in 1568. It is the first edition to include all ten Centuries, as well as a second preface, the Letter to King Henry II. However, quatrains 55 to 100 of the seventh Century were never completed.

The first English edition titled The True Prophecies or Prognostications of Michael Nostradamus, Physician to Henry II. Francis II. and Charles IX. Kings of France, was published in London by Thomas Ratcliffe and Nathaniel, in the year 1672.

The predictions do not follow chronological coherence and were written combining French, Greek, Latin and Occitan. It is believed that it contains anagrams, mythological and astrological references, in a subjective language that makes comprehension difficult. Some scholars claim that this was a resource used by Nostradamus to evade the Holy Inquisition, for fear of being persecuted for heresy.

Most of the quatrains deal with disasters, and Nostradamus gained notoriety for the belief in his ability to predict the future.

Letter to King Henry II 
The open "Letter to King Henry II of France" is his dedicatory preface to the now-missing 1558 edition of The Propheties, as reprinted in the posthumous 1568 edition by Benoist Rigaud. After a formal introduction, it makes various claims about the sources of his inspiration and lists many cryptic prophecies (nearly all undated) that seemingly have little to do with those in the work itself.

These include:
 decadence and calamity threatening both Church and laity
 the advent of French rulers who will cause Europe to tremble
 the amalgamating of kingdoms and propagation of new laws
 the confrontation of England and a bloody invasion of Italy
 new alliances between Rome, Eastern Europe and Spain
 the liberation of Sicily from the Germans
 the persecution of the Arabs by the Latin nations
 the advent of the Antichrist like Xerxes and his hosts
 attacks by the Muslims on the Pope and his Church
 an eclipse of unprecedented darkness
 a great October upheaval lasting 73 years and seven months
 renewal of the Church by one from the 50th degree of latitude
 an attempt by peoples to free themselves which will result in even greater imprisonment
 the advent of the Great Dog and an even Greater Mastiff
 the rebuilding of the churches and restoration of the priesthood
 a new disaster, with crooked leaders and generals who will be disarmed by a sceptical populace
 a new military and regal saviour ruling from another 'little Mesopotamia'
 the putting down of a former tyranny by a conspiracy
 a powerful resurgence of Islam, with Western Christendom in decay and decline
 an unprecedented persecution of the Church, with two thirds of the population wiped out by pestilence
 desolation of the country and clergy, while the invading Arab military take over Malta, Mediterranean France and the offshore islands
 a Western counterinvasion that will rescue Spain from the invaders and pursue the Arabs back to the Middle East
 the depopulation of Israel, with the Holy Sepulchre turned into farm buildings
 terrible retribution inflicted on the Orientals by the Northerners, whose tongues will have acquired an Arabic admixture
 defeat of the Eastern leaders and seven-year triumph of the Northern Christians
 the persecution of Christians until 1792, when a totally new era will begin
 an extremely powerful Venice
 vast naval battles in the Adriatic, destruction of many cities and persecution of the Church and Pope
 a brief reign for the Antichrist, with a huge liberating army led into Italy by a 'Gallic Hercules'
 vast floods wiping out the very knowledge of letters
 universal peace toward the beginning of the seventh millennium after the Creation, and restoration of the Holy Sepulchre
 some great conflagration
 restoration of the papacy
 sacking of the Holy of Holies by pagans and destruction of the scriptures
 the reign of the Prince of Hell for 25 years after the Antichrist
 premonitory birds
 a new Golden Age of Saturn, the binding of Satan for a thousand years, and universal peace and harmony, with the Church finally triumphant

The letter also includes two different dates for the creation of the world.

Sources

 Leoni, E., Nostradamus and His Prophecies (Wings, 1961–82)
 Lemesurier, P., The Nostradamus Encyclopedia (Godsfield/St Martin’s, 1997)
 Lemesurier, P., Nostradamus – The Illustrated Prophecies (O Books, 2003)
 Wilson, I., Nostradamus: The Evidence (Orion, 2002)/ Nostradamus: The Man Behind the Prophecies (St Martin's 2007)

External links
 Full text of the Letter to King Henry II in English
 Facsimiles of original editions from 1568 onwards

References 

1555 books
1558 books
16th-century Latin books
16th-century poetry books
French books
French-language works
French poetry collections
Greek-language books
Henry II of France
Nostradamus
Occitan literature
Prophecy